Saalfeld-Rudolstadt II is an electoral constituency (German: Wahlkreis) represented in the Landtag of Thuringia. It elects one member via first-past-the-post voting. Under the current constituency numbering system, it is designated as constituency 29 and It covers the eastern part of Saalfeld-Rudolstadt.

Saalfeld-Rudolstadt II was created for the 1994 state election. Originally named Schwarzakreis II, it was renamed after the 1994 election. Since 2009, it has been represented by Maik Kowalleck of the Christian Democratic Union (CDU).

Geography
As of the 2019 state election, Saalfeld-Rudolstadt II covers the eastern part of Saalfeld-Rudolstadt and a small part of Sonneberg district, specifically the municipalities of Altenbeuthen, Drognitz, Gräfenthal, Hohenwarte, Kaulsdorf, Lehesten, Leutenberg, Probstzella, Saalfeld/Saale (excluding Wittgendorf), and Unterwellenborn (from Saalfeld-Rudolstadt), and Neuhaus am Rennweg (only Lichte and Piesau) from Sonneberg.

Members
The constituency has been held by the Christian Democratic Union since its creation in 1994. Its first representative was Harald Stauch, who served from 1994 to 2009. Since 2009, it has been represented by Maik Kowalleck.

Election results

2019 election

2014 election

2009 election

2004 election

1999 election

1994 election

References

Electoral districts in Thuringia
1994 establishments in Germany
Saalfeld-Rudolstadt
Constituencies established in 1994